The Partenavia P.70 Alpha was a 1970s Italian two-seat light aerobatic trainer designed by Luigi Pascale and built by Partenavia.

Design and development
The Alpha was a low-wing monoplane with a fixed tricycle landing gear and powered by a  Rolls-Royce Continental O-200-A engine. The Alpha first flew on the 24 April 1972 but only one was built and it did not enter production as the company was pre-occupied with producing the Partenavia P.68.

Specifications

References

Notes

Bibliography

Astore
1950s Italian civil utility aircraft
Low-wing aircraft
Aircraft first flown in 1972